Brijesnica is the name of several villages in Bosnia and Herzegovina:

Brijesnica (Bijeljina), in the municipality of Bijeljina
Brijesnica Velika, in the municipality of Doboj East
Brijesnica Mala, in the municipality of Doboj East
Brijesnica Gornja, in the municipality of Lukavac
Brijesnica Donja, in the municipality of Lukavac